Hugh Willoughby Jermyn (25 August 1820– 17 September 1903) was an Anglican bishop in the second half of the 19th century and the very start of the 20th.

Biography 
He was born in Swaffham, the son of George Bitton Jermyn, and educated at Westminster and Trinity Hall, Cambridge. Ordained in 1845, his career began as a curate at Kensington Parish Church after which he was incumbent of St John's, Forres. Following this he was Dean of Moray & Ross  then Archdeacon of Saint Kitts. He returned to Britain in 1858 to be Rural Dean of Dunster before being appointed Vicar of Barking. In 1871 he was elevated to the episcopate as the  3rd Anglican Bishop of Colombo and in 1875 translated to  Brechin. Eleven years later he became Primus of Scotland, a post he held until 1901. He died on 17 September 1903.

Archive Services at the University of Dundee hold papers relating to Jermyn's election as Bishop of Brechin.

References

1863 births
People from Swaffham
People educated at Westminster School, London
Alumni of Trinity Hall, Cambridge
Deans of Moray, Ross and Caithness
Archdeacons of St Kitts
Anglican bishops of Colombo
Bishops of Brechin (Episcopalian)
19th-century Anglican bishops in Asia
19th-century Anglican archbishops
20th-century Anglican archbishops
Primuses of the Scottish Episcopal Church
1903 deaths
British expatriates in Sri Lanka
19th-century Scottish Episcopalian bishops
20th-century Scottish Episcopalian bishops